The Principality of Halych, or Principality of Halychian Rus, was a medieval East Slavic principality, and one of main regional states within the political scope of Kievan Rus', established by members of the oldest line of Yaroslav the Wise descendants. A characteristic feature of Halych principality was an important role of the nobility and citizens in political life, consideration a will of which was the main condition for the princely rule. Halych as the capital mentioned in around 1124 as a seat of Ivan Vasylkovych the grandson of Rostislav of Tmutarakan. According to Mykhailo Hrushevsky the realm of Halych was passed to Rostyslav upon the death of his father Vladimir Yaroslavich, but he was banished out of it later by his uncle to Tmutarakan. The realm was then passed to Yaropolk Izyaslavich who was a son of the ruling Grand Prince Iziaslav I of Kiev.

Prehistory

The first recorded Slavic tribes living in the regions of Red Rus' were the White Croats and Dulebes. In the year 907 tribes of Croats and Dulebes were involved in the military campaign against Constantinople led by Rus' Prince Oleg of Novgorod. This was the first significant evidence of political affiliation among the native tribes of the Red Rus' region. According to Nestor the Chronicler some strongholds in West Part of Red Rus' were conquered by Vladimir the Great in 981, and in 992 or 993 Vladimir carried out a military campaign against the Croats. Around that time the city of Volodymyr was established in honor of him which became the main center of political power in the region. During the 11th century western border cities including Przemysl, were twice annexed by the Kingdom of Poland (1018–1031, and 1069–1080). In the meantime, Yaroslav the Wise established a "solid foot" in the region founding the city of Jarosław.

As part of the territory of the Kievan Rus' the area was later organized as the southern part of the Volodymyr Principality. Around 1085, with the help of the Grand Prince of Kiev Vsevolod I of Kiev the three Rostystlavych brothers - sons of Rostislav Vladimirovich (of Tmutarakan) settled. Their lands were organized into three smaller principalities of Przemysl, Zvenyhorod and Terebovlia. In 1097 the Terebovlia Principality was secured by the Council of Liubech   after several years of a civil war with Vasylko Rostyslavych. In 1124 the Halych Principality was given as minor principality to Ihor Vasylkovich by his father Vasylko, the Prince of Terebovlia who removed it from the larger Terebovlia Principality.

Unification
The Rostislavich Brothers managed not only politically separate from Volodymyr, but also to defend themselves from external enemies. In 1099, in the battle on Rozhne field the Halychians defeated army of the Grand Prince Sviatopolk II of Kiev and later that year the army of Hungarian king Coloman near Przemysl.

These two significant victories brought nearly one hundred years of relative peaceful development in the Halychian Principality.
The four sons of the Rostystlavych Brothers divided the area into four parts with centers in Przemysl (Rostislav), Zvenyhorod (Volodymyrko), Halych and Terebovlia (Ivan and Yuriy). After the death of three of them Volodimyrko took Przemysl and Halych and gave Zvenyhorod to Ivan - son of his older brother Rostyslav. In 1141 Volodymyrko moved his residence from Przemysl to more geographically advantageous Halych giving birth to a united Halychian Principality.
In 1145 citizens of Halych, taking advantage of the absence of Volodymyrko, called Ivan of Zvenyhorod to reign. After the defeat of Ivan under the walls of Halych, the Zvenygorod Principality was also incorporated into the Halychian lands.

Era of Yaroslav Osmomysl

Volodymyrko pursued a policy of balancing between neighbors. He managed to strengthen the power of the principality, attach some cities belonging to the Kiev Grand Prince and forced to keep them despite the conflict with both two powerful rulers Iziaslav II of Kiev and king Géza II of Hungary.

In 1152, after the death of Volodymyrko, the Halychian throne was succeeded by his only son Yaroslav Osmomysl. Yaroslav began his reign with the Battle on the river Siret in 1153 with Grand Prince Iziaslav, which resulted a heavy losses for the Halychians but lead to the retreat of Izyaslav, who died shortly thereafter. Thus the danger from the east had passed and Jaroslav via diplomacy reached peace with his other neighbors - Hungary and Poland. Subsequently, thanks to negotiations Jaroslav neutralized his only rival - Ivan, the eldest descendant of the Rostislavich Brothers, former Prince of Zvenyhorod.

These diplomatic successes enabled Yaroslav to focus on internal development of the Principality: the construction of new buildings in capital and other cities, enrichment of monasteries, as well as strengthening his power over the territory in lower courses of Dniester, Prut and Danube rivers. During this time (around 1157) the construction of the Assumption Cathedral - second largest temple of Ancient Rus after St. Sophia Cathedral in Kiev, was completed in Halych. The city itself grew into a big agglomeration being approximately 11 x 8.5 kilometers in size.
Despite his strong position in the international arena Yaroslav was under control of the Halychian citizens whose will he had to consider even sometimes in matters of his personal, family life.

"Freedom in princes"

A significant feature in political life of Halychian Principality was the decisive role of nobles and citizens. Halicyans used the principle of ″freedom in princes″ and themselves invited and expelled princes, also correcting their activities. Contrary to the will of Yaroslav Osmomysl who left the throne to his younger son Oleg, the Halychians invited his brother Vladimir II Yaroslavich, and later, after conflict with him, Roman the Great, prince of Volodymyr. But almost immediately Roman was replaced by Andrew - the son of Hungarian King Bela III. The reason for this choice was a complete freedom of government that was guaranteed by Béla and Andrew to Halychians. This period can be considered as the first experience of self-rule government by noblemen and citizens. However, the vulgar behavior of the Hungarian garrison and their attempts to install Roman Catholic rites led to another change in mood and to the throne again was returned Vladimir II, who ruled in Halych next decade up to year 1199.

Autocracy of Roman the Great and unification with Volhynia 

After the death of last descendant of Principality's founders Rostislavich Brothers - Vladimir II in 1199, Halychians started negotiations with the sons of his sister (daughter of Yaroslav Osmomysl) and the legendary Prince Igor (the main hero of the poem The Tale of Igor's Campaign) about succession to the Halychian throne. But Prince of Volodymir Roman with the help of Prince Leszek the White managed to capture Halych despite a strong resistance of residents.  Following next six years lasted a period of continued repression against the nobility and active citizens as well as a significant territorial and political expansion that transformed Halych in the main center of all Rus'. Volhynian principality was united with Halychian but this time the new Centre of Galicia-Volhynia principality became Halych. Further successful war with Igorevich Brothers contenders for the Galician throne enabled Roman the Great to establish his control over Kiev and place there his henchmen, one of them with the consent of Vsevolod the Big Nest. After victorious campaigns against the Cumans, and probably Lithuanians, Roman the Great reached the height of its power and was called in the annals as "The Tzar and Autocrator of all Rus'".
After the death of Roman in 1205, his widow to keep power in Halychia called for help Hungarian King Andrew, which sent her the military garrison. However, in next 1206 year Halychians again invited Vladimir III Igorevich - son of Yaroslav Osmomysl's daughter, and Roman's widow, along with the sons had to flee the city.

Climax of citizens-nobles rule

Vladimir III reigned in Halychia only for two years. As a result of feuds with his brother Roman II, he was expelled and the latter took the Halychia throne. But very soon Roman was replaced by Rostislav II of Kiev. When Roman II managed to overthrow Rostislav, Halychians called for help the Hungarian king who sent to Halych palatine Benedict. While Benedict remained in Halych citizens called to the throne Prince Mstislav the Dumb from Peresopnytsya, who also with ridicules sent home. In an effort to get rid of Benedict, the citizens again invited the Ihrevychiv Brothers - Vladimir III and Roman II who expelled Benedict and regained their rule in the Principality. Vladimir III settled in Halych, Roman II in Zvenigorod and their brother Svyatoslav in Przemysl. Attempts of the Igorevich Brothers to rule by themselves led to conflict with the Halychians during which many of them were killed, and later the Igorevich Brothers were executed. On the throne was placed a young son of Roman the Great Daniel of Halych. After his mother made an attempt to concentrate power in her hands as regent, she was banished from the city and Mstislav the Dumb was again invited to reign, but he fled fearing Hungarian troops had been called by of Daniel's mother. After the failure of the Hungarian King's campaign, the local community had made a unique step in the history of Rus', enthroned in 1211 or 1213 one of the Halychian nobles Volodyslav Kormylchych. This episode can be considered as a peak of citizens-nobles democracy in Halych.
 
Rule of Volodyslav caused aggression of neighboring states and in spite of the Halychian's resistance they managed to overwhelm Volodyslav's army. In 1214 Hungarian King Andrew and Polish Prince Leszek signed an agreement about partition of Halychian principality. The western edge passed to Poland and the rest to Hungary. Palatine Benedict returned to Halych and the son of Hungarian king Andrew Koloman, received the crown from the Pope with the title of "King of Galicia." However, religious conflict with the local population and capture by Hungarians territory that was transferred to Poland, led to the expulsion in 1215 of all foreign forces and the enthronement of Prince Mstislav the Bold from Novgorod under whose reign all power was concentrated in the hands of the nobility and Prince not disposed even Halychian army. Despite this Mstislav also was not popular among the Halychians, who gradually began to favor Prince Andrew. In 1227 Mstislav allowed his daughter to marry him and gave them government in Halychia. Andrew has been a long time favorite of Halychia due to its careful approach to the rights of the nobility. However, in 1233 part of Halychians invited Daniel. As a result of the siege and the death of Andrew Daniel briefly seized the capital, but was forced to leave it not finding support of citizens majority. In 1235, at the invitation of Halychians to the city came Chernigov Prince Michael of Chernigov and his son Rostislav (his mother was the daughter of Roman the Great, the sister of Daniel). During the Mongol invasion, Halych turns in the hands of Daniel, but his power was not certain, because at this time chronicle mentions an ascension to the throne a loсal nobleman Dobroslav Suddych.

Daniel of Galicia and Mongol invasion 
In the 1240s in Halychian Principality's history occurred an important changes. In 1241 Наlych was captured by the Mongol army. In 1245 Daniel won a decisive battle over the Hungarian-Polish army of his opponent Rostislav and again unites Halychia with Volhynia. After the victory build his residence in Holm in the western part of Volhynia. After Daniel's visit to Batu Khan, started payments of tribute to Golden Horde. All these factors led to the beginning of cultural, economic and political decline of Halych.

Last rise and decline 
Already in the time of Daniel's rule Halychia turned to the hands of his elder son Leo I of Halych, who, after his father's death, gradually takes power in all areas of Volhynia. In the second half of the thirteenth century, he raised the importance of Lviv - a new political-administrative center, founded near Zvenigorod on the border with Volhynia. Near 1300, Leo, in a short time, achieved power over Kyiv, remaining however dependent on the Golden Horde. After the death of Leo, the center of the united Halychian-Volhynian state returns to the city of Volodymyr. In the times of following princes, nobles gradually regained power, and from 1341 to 1349, it came in the hands of nobleman Dmytro Dedko, at the nominal reign of prince Liubartas. 
In 1349, after the death of Dmytro, Polish King Casimir III the Great marched on Lviv, while coercing with the Golden Horde and the Hungarian kingdom. 
The result was the end of political independence of Halych and its annexation into the Polish crown.

Post-history
In 1387 all lands of the Halychian principality were included in to the possessions of Polish Queen Jadwiga, and later in 1434 transformed into Rus' Voivodeship. In 1772, Halychia was attached to the Austrian Empire within which it existed as an administrative unit called "Kingdom of Galicia and Lodomeria" with the center in Lviv.

Relations with Byzantine Empire
Halychian Principality had a close ties with Byzantine Empire, closest than any other principality of Kievan Rus. According to some records, Volodar of Peremyshl's daughter Irina was married in 1104 to Isaac - third son of Byzantine Emperor Alexios I Komnenos. Her son, future Emperor Andronicus I Comnenus some time lived in Halych and ruled by several cities of principality in years 1164-65.
According to reports of Bartholomew of Lucca Byzantine Emperor Alexius III fled to Halych after the capture of Constantinople by Crusaders in 1204.
Halychian Principality and Byzantine Empire were frequent allies in the fight against Cumans.

Princes of Halych

References

Bibliography
 Hrushevsky, M. History of Ukraine-Rus. Saint Petersburg, 1913.
 History of Ukraine-Rus. Vienna, 1921.
 Illustrated history of Ukraine. "BAO". Donetsk, 2003.  (Chief Editor - Iosif Broyak)

External links
 Halych principality in Encyclopedia of Ukraine, vol. 2 (1988).  (Encyclopedia of Ukraine)

States and territories established in 1124
Political history of Ukraine
Former principalities
Subdivisions of Kievan Rus'
States and territories disestablished in the 12th century
Historical regions in Ukraine